Gainsboro Historic District is a national historic district located of Roanoke, Virginia.  It encompasses 202 contributing buildings and 1 contributing structure in the African-American neighborhood of Gainsboro in Northwest Roanoke. They include single- and multiple-family dwellings, three churches; one parish hall, the Gainsboro Library, a theater, a hotel, two medical office buildings, six commercial buildings, one industry and one bridge. The buildings were primarily built between 1890 and 1925.  Located in the district are the separately listed Gainsboro Branch of the Roanoke City Public Library and Henry Street Historic District.

It was listed on the National Register of Historic Places in 2005.

References

African-American history of Virginia
Historic districts on the National Register of Historic Places in Virginia
Buildings and structures in Roanoke, Virginia
National Register of Historic Places in Roanoke, Virginia